A Tomb of the Unknown Soldier or Tomb of the Unknown Warrior is a monument dedicated to the services of an unknown soldier and to the common memories of all soldiers killed in war. Such tombs can be found in many nations and are usually high-profile national monuments. Throughout history, many soldiers have died in war with their remains being unidentified. Following World War I, a movement arose to commemorate these soldiers with a single tomb, containing the body of one such unidentified soldier.

History 

A shrine in Jinju, Korea, which commemorated those who died in defense of Korea during the Imjin War in 1592, has been described as the first Tomb of the Unknown Soldier. It is, however, more inclusive, in that it is a memorial to all who died in defense of the city against the forces of Toyotomi Hideyoshi, civilian as well as soldier. Beginning in 1593, when the Ministry of Rites received permission to perform a sacrifice for all who died in the battle, not only the identifiable bodies, the state offered sacrifices for the dead twice a year in spring and autumn until 1908, when the practice was ended by royal edict.

The first known monument of an unknown soldier in Europe is Landsoldaten ("The Valiant Private Soldier") (1849), from the First Schleswig War, in Fredericia, Denmark.

France and the United Kingdom 
During the First World War, the British and French armies who were allies during the war jointly decided to bury soldiers themselves. In the UK, under the Imperial War Graves Commission (now Commonwealth War Graves Commission), the Reverend David Railton had seen a grave marked by a rough cross while serving in the British Army as a chaplain on the Western Front, which bore the pencil-written legend "An Unknown British Soldier".

He suggested (together with the French in their own country) the creation at a national level of a symbolic funeral and burial of an "Unknown Warrior", proposing that the grave should in the UK include a national monument in the form of what is usually, but not in this particular case, a headstone. The idea received the support of the Dean of Westminster, Prime Minister David Lloyd George, and later from King George V, responding to a wave of public support. At the same time, a similar concern grew in France. In November 1916, a local officer of Le Souvenir français proposed the idea of burying "an unknown soldier" in the Panthéon. A formal bill was presented in Parliament in November 1918. The decision was voted into law in September 1919.

The United Kingdom and France conducted services connected with their 'monumental' graves (as presumably newly conceived, and in any case approved, by their respective armies) on Armistice Day 1920 (the burial itself taking place later in January of the following year in France). In the UK, the Tomb of the Unknown Warrior was created at Westminster Abbey, while in France La tombe du soldat inconnu was placed in the Arc de Triomphe.

Other countries 
The idea of a symbolic Tomb of the Unknown Soldier then spread to other countries. In 1921, the United States unveiled its own Tomb of the Unknown Soldier, Portugal its Túmulo do Soldado Desconhecido, and Italy its La tomba del Milite Ignoto. Other nations have followed the practice and created their own tombs.

In Chile and Ukraine, the second 'unknown tombs' were unveiled to commemorate The Unknown Sailor.

In Serbia, soldiers of World War I are commemorated by the Monument to the Unknown Hero on the mountain of Avala.

In the Philippines, the Tomb of the Unknown Soldier at the Libingan ng mga Bayani ("Cemetery of the Heroes") is the cemetery's most prominent structures.

Symbolism 
The Tombs of the Unknown Soldiers typically contain the remains of a soldier who is unidentified (or "known but to God" as the stone is sometimes inscribed). These remains are considered impossible to identify, and so serve as a symbol for all of a country's unknown dead wherever they fell in the war being remembered. The anonymity of the entombed soldier is the key symbolism of the monument; it could be the tomb of anyone who fell in service of the nation, and therefore serves as a monument symbolizing all of the sacrifices.

Identification

At least one unknown soldier has been identified by DNA analysis. This was an airman from the Vietnam War.

Examples 
Tombs of the Unknown Soldiers from around the world and various wars include the following:

See also 

 World War I memorials

References

External links 

 Copernicus Organization, World Veterans Federation, "Tombs of the Unknown Soldier in Central and Eastern Europe" by Prof. Michał Chilczuk, Chairman, Working Group on Central and Eastern Europe, SCEA
 

 
Military monuments and memorials
Soldiers
Unknown Soldier, Tomb of
Unidentified decedents
War monuments and memorials
World War I memorials
World War II memorials